Denmark is a town in Oxford County, Maine, United States. The population was 1,197 at the 2020 census. A number of ponds and lakes are located within the town.

History

The land was once part of Pequawket (now Fryeburg), village of the Sokokis Abenaki Indians. Attacked by Captain John Lovewell in 1725 during Dummer's War, the tribe abandoned the area and fled to Canada. The township combined a grant made by the Massachusetts General Court to Fryeburg Academy, Foster's Gore and a strip from Brownfield. Several settlers came from Andover, Massachusetts. It was incorporated as Denmark on February 20, 1807, and named in a show of solidarity with Denmark. That country's capital, Copenhagen, was attacked in 1801 and 1807 by the Royal Navy, which in 1775 had attacked Portland.

Farmers found the soil to be very stony and sandy, producing fair yields of potatoes, corn and oats. But the town did have excellent water powers at the streams, and mills were established to manufacture grain, long lumber, barrel staves, sashes, blinds and doors. Denmark Village was established at the foot of Moose Pond, whose outlet, Moose Pond Brook, provided the best water-power site. Today, the town is site of summer camps. Camp Wyonegonic, founded 1902, is the oldest girls' camp in the country. Also in Denmark is Camp Walden, established in 1916. Founded in 1994, the Denmark Arts Center is the latest addition to the town's culture.

Geography
Denmark is drained by Moose Pond Brook and the Saco River.

The town is crossed by State Routes 117 and 160. It is bordered by the towns of Bridgton to the northeast, Sebago to the southeast, Hiram to the south, Brownfield to the southwest, and Fryeburg to the northwest.

Demographics

As of 2000, the median income for a household in the town was $45,885, and the median income for a family was $57,625. The per capita income for the town was $28,563. About 5.4% of families and 7.8% of the population were below the poverty line, including 12.2% of those under age 18 and 6.9% of those age 65 or over.

2010 census
As of the census of 2010, there were 1,148 people, 479 households, and 330 families residing in the town. The racial makeup of the town was 98.4% White, 0.4% African American, 0.1% Native American, 0.3% Asian, 0.3% from other races, and 0.5% from two or more races. Hispanic or Latino of any race were 0.3% of the population.

There were 479 households, of which 28.6% had children under the age of 18 living with them, 57.6% were married couples living together, 6.7% had a female householder with no husband present, 4.6% had a male householder with no wife present, and 31.1% were non-families. 23.0% of all households were made up of individuals, and 8.3% had someone living alone who was 65 years of age or older. The average household size was 2.40 and the average family size was 2.80.

The median age in the town was 46.6 years. 21.7% of residents were under the age of 18; 5% were between the ages of 18 and 24; 20.5% were from 25 to 44; 36.4% were from 45 to 64; and 16.4% were 65 years of age or older. The gender makeup of the town was 52.0% male and 48.0% female.

Government
Denmark has a town meeting-selectmen-town manager form of government and is governed by a municipal charter. The three-member board of selectmen is elected at large on a non-partisan basis for staggered three-year terms. The town manager is appointed by the board of selectmen for an initial term of up to two years and may be reappointed in successive terms of up to three years each. Betty LeGoff is Denmark's town manager after being vacated by Ephrem Paraschak in June 2014

Education
The school system that serves Denmark is known as Maine School Administrative District 72 or MSAD 72. MSAD 72 also serves the municipalities of Brownfield, Fryeburg, Lovell, Stoneham, Stowe and Sweden in addition to Denmark.

Notable people 

 Nathaniel Cobb Deering, US congressman
 Richard L. Dunn, state legislator (1962–1972)
 Rufus Ingalls, Civil War era general
 Nancy Masterton, state legislator (1977–1984)
 James W. Milliken, Michigan state senator
 Hazen S. Pingree, 24th governor of Michigan (1897–1901), mayor of Detroit (1889–1897)
 Ralph Sarty, state legislator (2007–2012)

Photographs

References

External links
 Congregational Church
 Town of Denmark
 Maine School Administrative District #72
 Brownfield-Denmark Elementary School
 Oxford County
 Denmark Arts Center

Towns in Oxford County, Maine
Towns in Maine